Farrer Park MRT station is an underground Mass Rapid Transit (MRT) station along the North East line, located on the boundary of Kallang and Rochor planning areas, Singapore. It is one of the two stations that serve the ethnic district of Little India. The station sits underneath the Connexion building, an integrated hospital (Farrer Park Hospital) and hotel complex (One Farrer Hotel).

Farrer Park was named after John Farrer, who was President of the Municipal Commissioners from 1919 to 1931.

History

To accommodate the construction of the station, the formerly straight Race Course Road was broken up to its current two-part alignment, with both ends linked by junctions with Rangoon Road. Owen Road was also broken into two, as evident from its current alignment between Serangoon Road and Pek Kio estate. 55 lots required for the construction of the Farrer Park MRT station and the realignment of Race Course Road need to be surrendered by March 1997. However, as for the 51 lots required for the widening of Tessensohn Road and comprehensive redevelopment, the date of possession can be deferred to December 1997.

Construction was awarded on 15 June 1997 under the NEL Contract 706.

Before the station opened, the Singapore Civil Defence Force conducted the second ever Shelter Open House on 15–16 February 2003, together with Chinatown, Serangoon, and Hougang stations.

Station details
Located between Rangoon Road and Gloucester Road, Farrer Park station is close to Farrer Park Hospital, City Square Mall and Mustafa Centre. The station is served by the North East Line, between Little India and Boon Keng stations, and has the station code "NE8".

Art in Transit
Farrer Park is an area with a rich sporting heritage and history, and also known for being the site of Singapore's earliest horse racing turf club from the street name 'Old Racecourse Road' draws its name from. Farrer Park's interior design captured the spirit of the locality's sporting heritage with the Horse Racing and Soccer series of artworks titled Rhythmic Exuberance, by Singapore artist Poh Siew Wah. Another artwork by Poh, titled Aeroplane paid tribute to the first aeroplane landing in Singapore in 1911 at the Old Racecourse Road in Farrer Park.

References

External links

 Official website

Railway stations in Singapore opened in 2003
Kallang
Rochor
Mass Rapid Transit (Singapore) stations